= Joseph Juwon Faniyi =

Nigerian politician

Faniyi Josephn Juwon (born August 1960) is a Nigerian politician from Kogi State. He represented Yagba Federal Constituency in the National Assembly from 2003 to 2007, as a member of the All Nigeria Peoples Party (ANPP).

== Early life and education ==
Faniyi Josephn Juwon was born in August 1960 in Kano State, Nigeria. He pursued his higher education at the University of Jos (UNIJOS), where he obtained a Bachelor of Science degree. He later earned a Master of Business Administration (MBA) from the University of Ilorin (UNILORIN).

== Personal life ==
Juwon is married and has three children.

== Awards and honours ==
In 2002, he received the Jaycees Unilorin Humanitarian Award in recognition of his contributions to humanitarian causes.
